The Rockford Lightning was a basketball team that played in the Continental Basketball Association. They were based in Rockford, Illinois.

History 
The Lightning were the oldest team in the CBA, originally existing as the Lancaster Red Roses from Lancaster, Pennsylvania. That team changed their name to the Lancaster Lightning, then the franchise moved to Baltimore for a year before relocating in Rockford. Their home arena was the MetroCentre.

They were the runners-up in the 2001-02 and 2004-05 CBA seasons, losing a winner-take-all championship game to the Dakota Wizards 116–109 in 2002, and a best-of-5 series to the Sioux Falls Skyforce 3–1 in 2005.

On January 20, 2006, the team's owner announced that the Lightning would cease operations after the season unless other investors purchased the team and continued its operations. An attempt was made to constitute a new local ownership group, but it was unsuccessful, and the team folded. The Lightning's main rival was the Quad City Thunder.

NBA call-ups
 Bruce Bowen (1995-97) - Miami Heat, Boston Celtics, Philadelphia 76ers, San Antonio Spurs
 Sam Mack - Vancouver Grizzlies
 Gerald Madkins Golden State Warriors
 Earl Boykins (1998-99)
 Matt Steigenga
 Linton Johnson
 Darrell Walker (coach)
 Mike James
 Larry Sykes
 Desmond Ferguson
 Howard Eisley
 Ken Bannister

References

 
Basketball teams in Illinois
Basketball teams in Baltimore
Basketball teams in Philadelphia 
Basketball teams established in 1978
Basketball teams disestablished in 2006
1978 establishments in Pennsylvania
2006 disestablishments in Illinois